Elections to Liverpool City Council were held on 1 November 1910.

Fourteen of the thirty-four wards were not contested.

After the election, the composition of the council was:

Election result

Ward results

* - Retiring Councillor seeking re-election

Comparisons are made with the 1907 election results, as the retiring councillors were elected in that year.

Abercromby

Aigburth

Anfield

Breckfield

Brunswick

Castle Street

Dingle

Edge Hill

Everton

Exchange

Fairfield

Garston

Granby

Great George

Kensington

Kirkdale

Low Hill

Netherfield

North Scotland

Old Swan

Prince's Park

Sandhills

St. Anne's

St. Domingo

St. Peter's

Sefton Park East

Sefton Park West

South Scotland

Vauxhall

Walton

Warbreck

Wavertree

Wavertree West

West Derby

Aldermanic Elections

Aldermanic Election 9 November 1910

At the meeting of the Council on 9 November 1910, the terms of office of seventeen alderman expired.

The following seventeen were elected as Aldermen by the councillors on 9 November 1910 for a term of six years.

* - re-elected aldermen.

Aldermanic Election 3 May 1911

Caused by the death of Alderman Joachim Nicolas Stolterfoht (Conservative, elected as an alderman by the Council on 9 November 1907) on 8 March 1911, which was reported to the Council on 5 April 1911.
In his place, Councillor Robert Edward Walkington Stephenson (Conservative, West Derby, elected 1 November 1910)
 was elected as an alderman by the councillors on 3 May 1911.

By-Elections

No.10 Low Hill, 24 November 1910

Caused by the election as an alderman of Councillor Anthony Shelmerdine (Conservative, Low Hill, elected 1 November 1909) by the Council on 9 November 1910.

No. 24A Sefton Park East, 2 May 1911

Caused by the death of Councillor John Japp JP 
(Liberal, Sefton Park East, elected 1 November 1909) on 27 March 1911, which was reported to the Council on 5 April 1911
.

The Term of Office to expire on 1 November 1912.

No. 12 Edge Hill, 27 April 1911

Caused by the resignation of Councillor Edward Whitley (Labour, elected 1 November 1910), which was reported to the Council on 5 April 1911.

No. 28 West Derby,  23 May 1911

Caused by the election of Councillor Robert Edward Walkington Stephenson (Conservative, West Derby, 
elected 1 November 1910)
 as an alderman by the Council on 3 May 1911.

No. 13 North Scotland, 5 August 1911

Caused by the resignation of Councillor Dr. Joseph Maguire (Irish Nationalist, North Scotland, elected unopposed 1 November 1909)

References

1910
1910 English local elections
1910s in Liverpool